Speiredonia itynx is a species of moth of the family Erebidae first described by Johan Christian Fabricius in 1787. It is found in India, Sri Lanka, Vietnam, Java, Palawan, Sulawesi and the Moluccas.

Description
Their wingspan ranges from 64 to 78 mm. The middle loop of the forewing is produced inwards almost to the discocellulars. There is a rufous spot found on the cell. Specimens very greatly in colour and spots. Some have purplish-grey patches on both wings, and some have ochreous patches on disk and centre of margin of both wings. Another morph has ochreous or white suffusion on sub-marginal area of forewings and postmedial area of hindwings.

References

External links
 

Moths described in 1787
Speiredonia